Horst Höltring (30 June 1913 – 24 August 1943) was a German U-boat commander in World War II.

Naval career
Horst Höltring joined the Reichsmarine in 1933. He went through U-boat training from March to October 1940. He served on the boat for more than a year, giving up command on 30 November 1941. From December 1941 to January 1942 he went through U-boat familiarization (Baubelehrung) in preparation for his next command. On 8 January 1942 Höltring commissioned the Type VIIC  at Hamburg. U-604 went on seven patrols, spending 203 days at sea. Six ships were sunk, totaling 40,000 tons. On the 7th patrol the boat was lost. Höltring survived the loss of his boat on 11 August 1943 after she was scuttled following an attack by two American aircraft. The entire crew of 45 men was rescued by two U-boats. Höltring died together with thirteen of his men when the boat that rescued half of his crew, was sunk 13 days later. According to survivors, when U-185 was fatally hit and chlorine gas was spreading through the boat, Höltring, himself wounded, jumped from his bunk with a pistol and ran to the forward torpedo room where two badly wounded men from U-604 begged to be shot to avoid drowning or suffocating, which he did, before taking his own life. Fourteen men from U-604 died on U-185.  had rescued the rest of Höltring's crew, and reached port with them at Lorient, France on 7 September 1943.

Summary of career

Ships sunk

Awards
Iron Cross 2nd Class
Iron Cross 1st Class
German Cross in Gold - 6 November 1943 (posthumous)

References

Bibliography

1913 births
1943 suicides
U-boat commanders (Kriegsmarine)
Recipients of the Gold German Cross
Reichsmarine personnel
People from Altona, Hamburg
Kriegsmarine personnel killed in World War II
People lost at sea
Suicides by firearm
German military personnel who committed suicide
Deaths by firearm in international waters
Deaths by airstrike during World War II
Military personnel from Hamburg